"El color de tus ojos" (English: "The color of your eyes") is a song originally recorded by Mexican duo Octubre Doce, and later covered by Banda MS. Banda MS released their version on August 14, 2017, as the lead single of their album "La mejor versión de mí". The song was written Omar Robles, member of Octubre Doce.
The version by Banda MS topped the Mexican charts and also charted in El Salvador, Guatemala and the United States.

Music video
Directed and produced by Johar Villareal, the music video features lead singer Alan Ramírez as a painter with an unrequited love. The video was shot in the city of Mazatlán and in Durango. 20 paintings of eyes were specifically created for the video.

Charts

Release history

See also
List of number-one songs of 2017 (Mexico)
List of number-one songs of 2018 (Guatemala)

References

2017 singles
Spanish-language songs
2017 songs
Monitor Latino Top General number-one singles
Banda MS songs